Thundergate is a 1923 American drama film directed by Joseph De Grasse and written by Perry N. Vekroff. The film stars Owen Moore, Virginia Brown Faire, Edwin B. Tilton, Sylvia Breamer, Robert McKim, and Richard Cummings. The film was released on October 15, 1923, by Associated First National Pictures.

Cast

Preservation
A print of Thundergate is held by the Archives Du Film Du CNC in Bois d'Arcy.

References

External links

1923 films
1920s English-language films
Silent American drama films
1923 drama films
First National Pictures films
Films directed by Joseph De Grasse
American silent feature films
American black-and-white films
1920s American films